Tom and Jerry: The Gene Deitch Collection is a one-disc DVD collection of animated short cartoons starring Tom and Jerry, all directed by Gene Deitch and released in 1961–62. It was released on June 2, 2015, in Region 1.

This collection brought all the Deitch Tom and Jerry cartoons together for the first time on DVD (on Region 1).
 
These are the same 13 cartoons that appear on European DVD collection in PAL format, Tom and Jerry: Classic Collection, Vol. 5., released in August 2004, albeit presented restored & remastered in the set, as opposed to the Turner TV broadcast prints used in the 2004 UK DVD.

All 13 of the Gene Deitch Tom and Jerry shorts are included, along with two documentaries. The DVD was released before Gene Deitch died on April 16, 2020 at the age of 95.

Disc Contents

1961 
 01 Switchin' Kitten
 02 Down and Outing
 03 It's Greek to Me-ow!

1962 
 04 High Steaks
 05 Mouse into Space
 06 Landing Stripling
 07 Calypso Cat
 08 Dicky Moe
 09 The Tom and Jerry Cartoon Kit
 10 Tall in the Trap
 11 Sorry Safari
 12 Buddies Thicker Than Water
 13 Carmen Get It!

Bonus Features 
 Tom and Jerry…and Gene: The Rembrandt Years (which contains a newly shot interview with Deitch discussing his work on the series and how he and his foreign team of animators continued to crank out these cartoons on a much smaller budget due to the studio changes.)
 Much Ado About Tom and Jerry (released on the Deluxe Anniversary Collection)

References 

Tom and Jerry